Aspen Hill may refer to:

 Aspen Hill, Maryland, a community
 Aspen Hill, Tennessee, a community
 Aspen Hill (Charles Town, West Virginia), listed on the National Register of Historic Places

See also 
 Aspen (disambiguation)
 Aspen Hall (disambiguation)